The 1934 Pacific Tigers football team represented the College of the Pacific—now known as the University of the Pacific—in Stockton, California as a member of the Far Western Conference (FWC) during the 1934 college football season. Led by second-year head coach Amos Alonzo Stagg, Pacific compiled an overall record of 4–5 with a mark of 2–2 in conference play, placing fourth in the FWC. The team was outscored by its opponents 76 to 67 for the season. The Tigers played home games at Baxter Stadium in Stockton.

Schedule

Notes

References

Pacific
Pacific Tigers football seasons
Pacific Tigers football